Or Lam is a mildly spicy, slightly tongue numbing, Laotian stew originating from Luang Prabang, Laos.  The peppery and thick broth is prepared by slowly simmering lemongrass, chilies and Lao chili wood (sakhaan) with crushed or mashed up sticky rice, grilled citronella, garlic and onions added to thicken the broth.

Or Lam is usually cooked with dried buffalo skin, beef, game meat, quail or chicken, eggplants, wood ear mushrooms, and yard-long bean. In the original royal Luang Prabang's recipe Or lam is made with deer meat. The stew is extremely popular in Laos.

References

External links
Lao Recipes
Or Lam Gai Recipe

Southeast Asian curries
Stews
Lao cuisine